Carolina Espinosa is an Ecuadorean Dressage rider. She won team gold during the 2017 Bolivarian Games in Bogota, Colombia and team bronze during the 2013 Bolivarian Games in Lima, Peru. She also competed at the 2011 Pan American Games and at the 2019 Pan American Games.

References 

Living people
1976 births
female equestrians
Ecuadorean dressage riders
Equestrians at the 2011 Pan American Games
Pan American Games competitors for Ecuador
South American Games medalists in equestrian
South American Games silver medalists for Ecuador
20th-century Ecuadorian women
21st-century Ecuadorian women